INA colony is a residential colony maintained by the Airports Authority of India for their employees.  It was named after a former private airline, Indian National Airways, which was amongst those nationalised and merged to form, Indian Airlines in 1953.

Situated on Aurobindo Marg, across Dilli Haat and behind INA Market, the colony lies near Safdarjung Airport, on Sri Aurobindo Marg, Kotla Mubarakpur opposite to Laxmibai Nagar adjacent to Kidwai Nagar East. The INA market also has shops selling varieties of imported foodstuff and wines for expatriates due to its proximity to Chanakyapuri diplomatic enclave. Starting 2010, it is serviced by the Dilli Haat - INA underground station of the Delhi Metro.
INA market is also famous for its Sea Food items.

Location
The colony is located in South Delhi between Ring Road and Ring Railway. It lies on the eastern side of Sri Aurobindo Marg, opposite to Laxmi Bai Nagar.

Nearby landmarks include:
 Safdarjung Terminal
 Dilli Haat, AIIMS
 Safdarjung Hospital
 Safdarjung Airport
 Lodhi Colony Railway Station

INA colony is located at

Size
This colony comprises two pockets - A & B, and has five types of flats, viz

Approximately 1000 flats in total are located.

Postal details
PIN code - 110 023
Post Office - Sarojini Nagar
Nearest Police station Sarojini Nagar, Lodhi colony, Kotla Mubarakpur.
Police Station Jurisdiction Kotla Mubarakpur.

Facilities available
Medical Centre
Community centre
Children Parks (3 nos) located in pkts A & B
Transit Hostel
Kendriya Bhandar 
Electrical & Civil Complaint cell
Wellness centre

AAEU employee union office

ACOA(I) office

Gopal Mandir in pkt - A
Gurudwara
5 gates equipped with 24 hour security guards posted.

INA Consists of

INA Colonies
Kendriya Bhandar
Two schools:- Kendriya Vidyalaya, INA Colony and Sarvodaya Vidyalaya, INA Colony, adjacent to each other and near near Vikas sadan.
One Montessori School:-MMI KALYANMAYEE, Pocket B, INA Colony
DDA offices, also known as "Vikas Sadan"
Central Vigilance Commission office, INA Colony

Picture gallery

References

External links

Neighbourhoods in Delhi